The 2017 Princeton Tigers football team represented Princeton University in the 2017 NCAA Division I FCS football season. They were led by eighth-year head coach Bob Surace and played their home games at Powers Field at Princeton Stadium. Princeton is a member of the Ivy League. They finished the season 5–5 overall and 2–5 in Ivy League play to place seventh. Princeton averaged 7,366 fans per game.

Schedule
The 2017 schedule consisted of six home games and four away games. The Tigers hosted Ivy League foes Columbia, Cornell, and Yale, and traveled to Brown, Harvard, Penn, and Dartmouth.

Princeton's non-conference opponents were San Diego of the Pioneer Football League and Lafayette and Georgetown of the Patriot League.

Game summaries

San Diego

Lafayette

Columbia

Georgetown

Brown

Harvard

Cornell

Penn

Yale

Dartmouth

References

Princeton
Princeton Tigers football seasons
Princeton Tigers football